KLSV-LD is a low-power digital television station in Las Vegas, Nevada, broadcasting locally on UHF channel 50 as a Jewelry TV affiliate. Founded April 13, 1989, the station is owned by Biltmore Broadcasting Las Vegas. The station airs informercials on their 50.3 sub-channel.  On September 18, 2013, 50.1 lit up briefly with a simulcast of Jewelry TV from the stations 50.2, but the psip read "LATV Feed". This caused some to believe that the Hispanic network LATV may be moving to KSLV 50.1 from KINC 15.2 in the near future.

External links

LSV-LD
Television channels and stations established in 1993
1993 establishments in Nevada
Low-power television stations in the United States